Miomelon is a genus of sea snails, marine gastropod mollusks in the family Volutidae.

Species
Species within the genus Miomelon include:

 Miomelon alarconi Stuardo & Villas, 1974
 Miomelon eltanini Dell, 1990
 Miomelon philippiana (Dall, 1890)
 Miomelon turnerae Dell, 1990

References

External links
 

Volutidae